Jean Talouzian is a Lebanese politician who has served as member of parliament since 2018. He was a member of the Lebanese Forces and its parliamentary bloc, the Strong Republic.

On 22 October 2020, Talouzian left LF bloc when he nominated Saad Hariri to form the gov unlike the rest of the LF bloc.

References 

Living people
Lebanese politicians
Lebanese Forces politicians
Year of birth missing (living people)